Mount Liszt is a snow-covered mountain, about  high, with a scarp on its southeastern face, rising  northeast of Mount Grieg, on the Beethoven Peninsula, situated in the southwest portion of Alexander Island, Antarctica. A number of mountains in this vicinity first appear on maps by the Ronne Antarctic Research Expedition (RARE), 1947–48. This mountain, apparently one of these, was mapped from RARE air photos by D. Searle of the Falkland Islands Dependencies Survey in 1960, and was named by the UK Antarctic Place-Names Committee after Franz Liszt, the Hungarian composer.

See also
 Mount McArthur
 Mount Morley
 Mount Schumann
 Dint Island
 Gannon Nunataks

References

Mountains of Alexander Island
Mount Liszt